The arrondissement of Calvi is an arrondissement of France in the Haute-Corse department in the territorial collectivity of Corsica. It has 51 communes.

Composition

The communes of the arrondissement of Calvi, and their INSEE codes, are:

 Algajola (2B010)
 Aregno (2B020)
 Avapessa (2B025)
 Barbaggio (2B029)
 Belgodère (2B034)
 Calenzana (2B049)
 Calvi (2B050)
 Cateri (2B084)
 Corbara (2B093)
 Costa (2B097)
 Farinole (2B109)
 Feliceto (2B112)
 Galéria (2B121)
 L'Île-Rousse (2B134)
 Lama (2B136)
 Lavatoggio (2B138)
 Lumio (2B150)
 Manso (2B153)
 Mausoléo (2B156)
 Moncale (2B165)
 Montegrosso (2B167)
 Monticello (2B168)
 Murato (2B172)
 Muro (2B173)
 Nessa (2B175)
 Novella (2B180)
 Occhiatana (2B182)
 Oletta (2B185)
 Olmeta-di-Tuda (2B188)
 Olmi-Cappella (2B190)
 Palasca (2B199)
 Patrimonio (2B205)
 Pietralba (2B223)
 Piève (2B230)
 Pigna (2B231)
 Pioggiola (2B235)
 Poggio-d'Oletta (2B239)
 Rapale (2B257)
 Rutali (2B265)
 Saint-Florent (2B298)
 San-Gavino-di-Tenda (2B301)
 Sant'Antonino (2B296)
 Santa-Reparata-di-Balagna (2B316)
 Santo-Pietro-di-Tenda (2B314)
 Sorio (2B287)
 Speloncato (2B290)
 Urtaca (2B332)
 Vallecalle (2B333)
 Vallica (2B339)
 Ville-di-Paraso (2B352)
 Zilia (2B361)

History

The arrondissement of Calvi was created as part of the department Golo in 1800. In 1811 it became an arrondissement of the department Corse. It was disbanded in 1926 and restored in 1943. Since 1976 it has been an arrondissement of the department Haute-Corse. On 1 January 2010, it gained the two cantons of Le Haut-Nebbio and La Conca-d'Oro from the arrondissement of Bastia.

As a result of the reorganisation of the cantons of France which came into effect in 2015, the borders of the cantons are no longer related to the borders of the arrondissements. The cantons of the arrondissement of Calvi were, as of January 2015:

 Belgodère
 Calenzana
 Calvi
 La Conca-d'Oro
 Le Haut-Nebbio
 L'Île-Rousse

Sub-prefects 
 Pierre-Henry Maccioni : on 1 March 1982

References

Calvi